Antônio Alves Pinto (born 1967) is a Brazilian film score composer. He is the son of the famous cartoonist Ziraldo and the brother of the film-maker Daniela Thomas. His work earned him a World Soundtrack Award and an ASCAP award, as well as a nomination in the Best Original Song category at the 65th Golden Globe Awards for writing the song "Despedida" with Shakira.
He composed the soundtrack to The Mosquito Coast and played the key instruments.

Filmography
1994: Menino Maluquinho - O Filme
1995: Socorro Nobre
1998: O Primeiro Dia
1998: Menino Maluquinho 2 - A Aventura
1998: Central Station
1999: Notícias de Uma Guerra Particular
2001: Behind the Sun
2001: Palíndromo
2001: Onde a Terra Acaba
2002: City of Men (TV series)
2002: City of God
2002: A Janela Aberta
2004: Crónicas
2004: Nina
2004: Collateral (additional music)
2005: Lord of War
2005: All the Invisible Children
2005: Jonny Zero (TV series) (theme music)
2006: Journey to the End of the Night (actor)
2006: 10 Items or Less
2007: Love in the Time of Cholera
2007: City of Men
2007: Perfect Stranger
2009: The Vintner's Luck
2009: Adrift
2010: Lula, The Son of Brazil
2010: Senna
2012: Get the Gringo
2012: The Odyssey (with Dudu Aram)
2013: Snitch
2013: The Host
2014: Trash
2015: Self/less (with Dudu Aram)
2015: Amy
2015: McFarland, USA
2017: Shot Caller
2019: Diego Maradona
2019: The Boy Who Harnessed the Wind
2020: Nine Days
2020: Joe Bell
2021: The Mosquito Coast
2021: Awake
2021: Pelé (2021 Netflix documentary)

References

External links
 

1967 births
Brazilian film score composers
Living people
Male film score composers
Musicians from Rio de Janeiro (city)